John Badcock (born 1952, in Queenstown) is a New Zealand artist, based in Geraldine, South Canterbury. He was born on 15 September 1952, Queenstown, New Zealand.

Badcock comes from an artistic family. His father Douglas Badcock and two brothers Brian and David are also painters.  Where the other family members specialise in landscape painting, John has become more renowned for portraiture. His art is described as Expressionist, and has been compared to works by artists such as Otto Dix. His work has encompassed many media – oils, watercolours, charcoals and acrylics.

He has been a professional artist for three decades. 
His accolades include solo exhibitions throughout New Zealand since 1985, and more recently the exhibiting of The Last Supper at the ChristChurch Cathedral. 
He has been a finalist in the New Zealand Portrait Awards in 2000, 2002, 2004 and 2006, and the subject of two New Zealand Art Films (John Badcock – a Film by Brian High, and A Changing Landscape – A Film by Simon Pattison).
Badcock's recently published first book, Passing People provides an in-depth look at his latest series of 100 portraits.
The following public galleries currently have collections of his work, Christchurch Art Gallery – Christchurch, Aigantighe Art Gallery – Timaru, and Anderson Park Gallery – Invercargill.

References

External links
John Badcock's personal website 

Living people
New Zealand artists
People from Queenstown, New Zealand
1952 births